Vuk Obradović (April 11, 1947 in the village of Kondželj, Yugoslavia – February 13, 2008 in Belgrade) was a Serbian general and politician. He was one of the leaders of the Democratic Opposition of Serbia in the Bulldozer Revolution in October 2000.

Before his political career, he was a professional soldier who later became the youngest General in the Yugoslav National Army. He held a PhD in political studies, having defended a thesis on issues of nationalism in Yugoslav society. He resigned from the Army in May 1992, when the government refused to withdraw Yugoslav Army conscripts from fighting in Croatia. 

After leaving the army, he formed the Social Democracy political party and remained its leader for almost 10 years. In 1997, he stood as a candidate in the Yugoslav presidential elections winning 3.04% of the popular vote. In 2000, he joined the Democratic Opposition of Serbia which finally toppled Slobodan Milošević in October that year. He became the Deputy Prime Minister in the Government of Serbia tasked with leading the drive against corruption. In May 2001, he was forced to resign due to an allegation of sexual harassment of a female aide Ljiljana Nestorović, leading to the break-up of Social Democracy party into two factions. 

In 2002, he was once again a candidate in the presidential election, this time winning only 0.73% of the popular vote.

External links
Biography of Vuk Obradović as Presidential candidate in 2002.
Interview with Vuk Obradović in 1999.
BBC interview 1999.
Obituary

1947 births
2008 deaths
People from Prokuplje
Social Democracy (Serbia) politicians
Candidates for President of Serbia
Generals of the Yugoslav People's Army